The 2022–23 World Rugby Women's Sevens Series  the tenth edition of the global circuit for women's national rugby sevens teams, organised by World Rugby. This series also, for the third time, doubled as a qualifier for the Olympic Games, with the top four countries qualifying automatically for the 2024 Olympic Sevens.

Core teams
The core teams qualified to participate in all tournaments for 2022–23 :

 
 
 
 
 
 
 
 
 
 
 

 was promoted to core team status by winning the 2022 Challenger Series. A combined  team replaced  as a core team for the series.

Tour venues
The schedule for the series :

Standings

The points awarded to teams at each event, as well as the overall season totals, are shown in the table below. Points for the event winners are indicated in bold. An asterisk (*) indicates a tied placing. A dash (—) is recorded where a team did not compete.

Source: World Rugby

{| class="wikitable" style="font-size:92%;"
|-
!colspan=2| Legend
|-
|style="width:4.5em;"|No colour
|- 
|style="background:#fcc;"|Pink
| the lowest placed core team at the end of 2022–23.
|- 
|style="background:#ffc;"|Yellow
|Not a core team
|-
|-
|}

Placings summary
Tallies of top-four placings in tournaments during the 2022–23 series, by team:

Player statistics

Scoring

Updated: 5 March 2023

Updated: 5 March 2023

Performance

 

Key: T: Tackles (1 pt), B: Line breaks (3 pts), O: Offloads (2 pts), C: Carries (1 pt)

Updated: 5 March 2023

Tournaments

Dubai

Cape Town

Hamilton

Sydney

Vancouver

See also
 2022–23 World Rugby Sevens Series (for men's teams)

References

External links
Official site

 
World Rugby Women's Sevens Series